HD 49976 is a variable star in the constellation of Monoceros (the Unicorn). It has the variable star designation V592 Monocerotis, while HD 49976 is the identifier from the Henry Draper Catalogue. It has a white hue and is near the lower limit of visibility to the naked eye, having an apparent visual magnitude that fluctuates from 6.16 down to 6.32 with a 2.976 day period. Based upon parallax measurements, it is located at a distance of approximately 337 light years from the Sun. The star is drifting further away with a radial velocity of +19 km/s.

Houk and Swift (1999) assigned it a class of B9V, matching a B-type main sequence star. It is an Alpha2 Canum Venaticorum variable; the magnetic field is complex; not corresponding to a simple dipole.

HD 49976 is an estimated 209 million years old and is spinning with a period of 2.976 days. The star has 2.2 times the mass of the Sun and 2.3 times the Sun's radius. It is radiating 32 times the luminosity of the Sun from its photosphere at an effective temperature of 9,016 K.

References

Ap stars
Alpha2 Canum Venaticorum variables
B-type main-sequence stars

Monoceros (constellation)
Durchmusterung objects
049976
032838
2534
Monocerotis, V592